Forest Lawn Memorial-Parks & Mortuaries is an American corporation that owns and operates a chain of cemeteries and mortuaries in Los Angeles, Orange, and Riverside counties in Southern California.

History 
The company was founded by a group of San Francisco businessmen in 1906. Hubert Eaton assumed management control in 1917 and is credited with being Forest Lawn's "founder" because of his origination of the "memorial-park" plan. The first location was in Tropico, which later became part of Glendale, California.

Its facilities are officially known as memorial parks. The parks are best known for the large number of celebrity burials, especially in the Glendale and Hollywood Hills locations. Eaton opened the first mortuary (funeral home) on dedicated cemetery grounds after a battle with established funeral directors, who saw the "combination" operation as a threat. He remained as general manager until his death in 1966, when he was succeeded by his nephew, Frederick Llewellyn.

Memorial parks 
 Forest Lawn Cemetery in Cathedral City, California 
 Forest Lawn – Covina Hills in Covina Hills, Covina, California
 Forest Lawn – Cypress in Cypress, California
 Forest Lawn Memorial Park in Glendale, California
 Forest Lawn Memorial Park in Hollywood Hills, Los Angeles, California 
 Forest Lawn Memorial Park in Long Beach, California

See also 
 Forest Lawn (disambiguation)

References

External links
 

Cemeteries in California
Companies based in Los Angeles County, California
1906 establishments in California
Companies established in 1906